The Bureau of Educational and Cultural Affairs (ECA) of the United States Department of State fosters mutual understanding between the people of the United States and the people of other countries around the world. It is responsible for the United States' cultural exchange programs.

Lee Satterfield, confirmed by the United States Senate on November 18, 2021, began service as assistant Secretary of State for the Bureau of Educational and Cultural Affairs on November 23, 2021.

History
In 1940, Nelson Rockefeller began the exchange of persons program with Latin America, as the Coordinator of Commercial and Cultural Affairs for the American Republics. This program sent 130 journalists from Latin America to the United States.

In 1942, The United States Office of War Information (OWI) was created out of the United States Government's need for a centralized location for information. OWI was disbanded under the Truman administration, though a small element of the original structure was maintained within the State Department as the Office of International Information and Cultural Affairs (OIC), which was renamed the Office of International Information and Educational Exchange.

In 1948, the Smith–Mundt Act sought to "promote a better understanding of the United States in other countries, and to increase mutual understanding." The educational and cultural exchange aspects of the State Department were removed from the Bureau of Public Affairs and entered the newly created Bureau of Educational and Cultural Relations (CU) in 1959.

In 1961, the 87th United States Congress passed the Fulbright-Hays Act (Mutual Educational and Cultural Exchange Act) to establish a program to "strengthen the ties which unite us with other nations by demonstrating the educational and cultural interests, developments, and achievements of the people of the United States and other nations". In 1978, the United States International Communication Agency (USICA) absorbed the bureau with the understanding that USICA was in charge of United States public diplomacy. Ronald Reagan renamed USICA to the United States Information Agency in 1982, and in 1999, USIA was absorbed by the State Department.

Programs
 Alumni TIES (Thematic International Exchange Seminars)
 Congress-Bundestag Youth Exchange
 Cultural Heritage Center
 Edmund S. Muskie Graduate Fellowship Program
 EducationUSA
 English Teaching Forum: A Journal for the Teacher of English Outside the United States
 Fulbright Scholarship
 National Security Language Initiative for Youth (NSLI-Y)
 Future Leaders Exchange (FLEX)
 Benjamin A. Gilman International Scholarship
 Hubert Humphrey Fellowship
 International Visitor Leadership Program
 TechWomen
 Youth Exchange and Study (YES)
 The Stevens Initiative
 Teachers of Critical Languages Program (TCLP)
 CLS Program
 Young African Leaders Initiative (YALI)
 Young Southeast Asian Leaders Initiative (YSEALI)

See also
 Cultural diplomacy
 Assistant Secretary of State for Educational and Cultural Affairs
 Public diplomacy
 United States Cultural Exchange Programs

References

External links
 
 
 Assistant Secretary of State for the Bureau of Educational and Cultural Affairs
 

 
ECA
Education policy in the United States
Cultural exchange
Government agencies established in 1961